The House Intelligence Subcommittee on Intelligence Community Management is one of the four subcommittees within the Permanent Select Committee on Intelligence

Members, 111th Congress

External links
Intelligence Committee Website

Intelligence Intelligence Community Management